Sharon Indian School, also known as Indian View, is a historic school building located at King William, King William County, Virginia.  The original 1919 Sharon School was a one-room, vernacular frame structure raised on brick piers. It was built for members of the Upper Mattaponi tribe, led by Mollie Holmes Adams and her husband, Jasper.  The original school is thought to have been razed around 1964. The extant 1952 Sharon School was designed by architect C.W. Huff, Jr., in association with architect Edward F. Sinnott (Richmond, VA).  It is a one-story, brick building with Hopper-style windows and assumes a vaguely International Style-inspired appearance.

It was listed on the National Register of Historic Places in 2007.

References

Defunct schools in Virginia
Mattaponi
School buildings on the National Register of Historic Places in Virginia
National Register of Historic Places in King William County, Virginia
School buildings completed in 1919
Schools in King William County, Virginia
Native American history of Virginia
1919 establishments in Virginia